Celleporella is a genus of bryozoans belonging to the family Hippothoidae.

The genus has cosmopolitan distribution.

Species:

Celleporella alia 
Celleporella angusta 
Celleporella annularis 
Celleporella carolinensis 
Celleporella catenifera 
Celleporella chilina 
Celleporella concava 
Celleporella cornuta 
Celleporella felderi 
Celleporella hyalina 
Celleporella marionensis 
Celleporella nodasakae 
Celleporella osiani 
Celleporella reflexa 
Celleporella retiformis 
Celleporella tehuelcha 
Celleporella tuberculata 
Celleporella uberrima

References

Bryozoan genera